TWE may refer to:

 Test of Written English, a required component of the computer-based TOEFL (Test of English as a Foreign Language)
 TransWest Express, an electricity transmission line in the US
 Trans World Express, an airline
 Treasury Wine Estates, a company

See also 
 Twe, a Cyrillic letter